Suicide Killers is a documentary film exploring the motivations of a suicide bomber. It includes rare and never-before-seen interviews with family members of terrorists, widows of suicide bombers and surviving terrorists whose suicide attacks failed. Also included is footage of a suicide bomber as he prepares for his mission.

See also
Pierre Rehov - director of this movie
Hussam Abdo - One of the child suicide bombers interviewed for this movie
Child suicide bombers in the Israeli-Palestinian conflict
Islamist terrorism

References

External links
Official website
View Trailer (caution: may contain images disturbing to some viewers)
Interview with director of "Suicide Killers" | Listen to audio - Chronicle Podcasts from the San Francisco Chronicle
DVD Review: Suicide Killers
 

2006 films
2006 documentary films
Works about Islamic terrorism
Documentary films about terrorism
Documentary films about suicide